Coniophoropsis is a fungal genus in the family Coniophoraceae. It is a monotypic genus, containing the single species Coniophoropsis obscura, found in Argentina. Both the genus and the species were described in 1986 by mycologists Kurt Hjorstam and Leif Ryvarden.

References

External links
 

Boletales
Monotypic Boletales genera
Fungi of Argentina
Taxa named by Leif Ryvarden